Sharat Singh Bhandari is a Nepalese politician and was Minister of Energy, Water Resources and Irrigation of Government of Nepal since 4 June 2021 but was removed from the post by Supreme Court on 22 June 2021 making the tenure of just 18 days and shortest till date.  He also assumed the post of Ministry of Defence under Baburam Bhattarai cabinet. He was elected to the Pratinidhi Sabha in the 1999 election on behalf of the Nepali Congress. When the Nepali Congress was divided, Bhandari sided with the Nepali Congress (Democratic)

References

Living people
Place of birth missing (living people)
Nepal MPs 2017–2022
Rastriya Janata Party Nepal politicians
Nepali Congress politicians from Madhesh Province
Members of the Rastriya Panchayat
Nepal MPs 1994–1999
Nepal MPs 1999–2002
Members of the 1st Nepalese Constituent Assembly
Rastriya Prajatantra Party politicians
Madhesi Jana Adhikar Forum, Nepal politicians
People's Socialist Party, Nepal politicians
Loktantrik Samajwadi Party, Nepal politicians
Nepali Congress (Democratic) politicians
1954 births
Nepal MPs 2022–present